The 2022–23 Texas A&M Aggies women's basketball will represent the Texas A&M University in the 2022–23 college basketball season. Led by first year head coach Joni Taylor, the team will play their games at Reed Arena and are members of the Southeastern Conference.

Schedule and results

|-
!colspan=12 style=|Non-conference regular season

|-
!colspan=12 style=|SEC regular season

|-
!colspan=6 style=| SEC Tournament

Rankings

See also
 2022–23 Texas A&M Aggies men's basketball team

References

Texas A&M Aggies women's basketball seasons
Texas AandM Aggies
Texas AandM Aggies women's basketball
Texas AandM Aggies women's basketball